Carl Justi (2 August 1832, in Marburg – 9 December 1912, in Bonn) was a German art historian, who practised a biographical approach to art history. Professor of art history at the University of Bonn, he wrote three major critical biographies: of Johann Joachim Winckelmann, of Diego Velázquez and of Michelangelo.

Life
Born in Marburg, Justi studied theology at the University of Berlin before transferring to philosophy. He graduated in 1859 with a thesis 'Über die ästhetischen Elemente in der platonischen Philosophie'.

Justi established his reputation with a three-volume work on Johann Joachim Winckelmann.
 He succeeded Anton Springer in the chair of art history at the University of Bonn, holding the post from 1872 until 1901.

Works
 Die ästhetischen Elemente in der platonischen Philosophie: ein historisch-philosophischer Versuch, Marburg: N. G. Elwert, 1860
 Winckelmann: sein Leben, Seine Werke und sein Zeitgenossen. 3 vols. Leipzig: F. C. W. Vogel, 1866–72.
  Diego Velázquez und sein Jahrhundert. Bonn: M. Cohen, 1888. Translated into English as Diego Velázquez and His Times. London: H. Grevel, 1889.
 Michelangelo: Beiträge zur Erklärung der Werke und des Menschen. Leipzig: Breitkopf & Härtel, 1900

References

External links
 Carl Justi at the Dictionary of Art Historians

1832 births
1912 deaths
People from Marburg
Academic staff of the University of Bonn
German art historians
German male non-fiction writers
Recipients of the Pour le Mérite (civil class)